Coby Bryant (born March 29, 1999) is an American football cornerback for the Seattle Seahawks of the National Football League (NFL). He played college football at Cincinnati.

Early life and high school
Bryant grew up in Cleveland, Ohio and attended Glenville High School.

College career
Bryant mostly played on special teams during his freshman season. He was named a starter going into his sophomore year and had 33 tackles and two interceptions. Bryant finished his junior season with 54 tackles, eight passes broken up and one interception. Bryant was named first-team All-American Athletic Conference as a senior. After considering entering the 2021 NFL Draft, Bryant decided to utilize the extra year of eligibility granted to college athletes who played in the 2020 season due to the coronavirus pandemic and return to Cincinnati for a fifth season. Bryant repeated as a first-team All-AAC selection as a senior and was named the winner of the Jim Thorpe Award.

Professional career

Bryant was drafted by the Seattle Seahawks with the 109th pick in the fourth round of the 2022 NFL Draft.

Personal life
Bryant is the younger brother of former NFL safety Christian Bryant.

References

External links
 Seattle Seahawks bio
Cincinnati Bearcats bio

Living people
Players of American football from Cleveland
American football cornerbacks
Cincinnati Bearcats football players
All-American college football players
1999 births
Seattle Seahawks players